Salvador arboreal alligator lizard (Abronia salvadorensis) is a species of lizard found in two isolated locations in Honduras.  One population in the department of La Paz and a smaller population in the department of Intibucá.

References

Abronia
Reptiles of Honduras
Reptiles described in 1983